Edward Conradi served as President of Florida State College for Women (now Florida State University) from 1909 to 1941, and as President Emeritus from 1941 until his death in 1944.

He was born on 20 February 1869 in New Bremen, Ohio. Conradi received bachelor's and master's degrees from Indiana University Bloomington, and completed a Ph.D. in Psychology from Clark University in 1904.

He moved to Florida in 1905, where he was principal of the Normal and Industrial School of St. Petersburg, Florida until he was appointed Dean of the Florida State College for Women, in 1909, by that school's president, Albert A. Murphree. Conradi only briefly held that office, as Murphree soon became President of the University of Florida, and Edward Conradi was named to replace him at FSCW. Conradi died in Tallahassee, Florida on 1 December 1944.

The old biology building at FSU is named in his honor, as is an endowed chair at the Department of Psychology.

External links
History of Florida State University
Presidents of Florida State University
Edward Conradi Papers
Conradi in FSU Digital Library

1869 births
1944 deaths
Presidents of Florida State University
Florida State University faculty
People from New Bremen, Ohio
Clark University alumni
Indiana University Bloomington alumni